The Pinnau is a  river, which flows right or northeast of the main river, Elbe. The Pinnau is therefore a tributary in the southern part of Schleswig-Holstein, Germany.

The Pinnau is categorized by German  (Federal/state association water) by "flow type" as a "marshland water body". The  lower part between the Elbe and Uetersen is navigable for Class II ships, the  middle part between Uetersen and Pinneberg is navigable but not classified.

Route 
The Pinnau has its source in the town of Henstedt-Ulzburg, then flows southwest, in Pinneberg to the west and ends in the municipality of Haselau in the Elbe, which streams in northwestern direction.

Hydrology 
The Pinnau is very much tide dependent and strongly influenced by tidal range.

Tributary rivers 
Krambek, first tributary river of the Pinnau
Bilsener Bek, second tributary from the right side
Ebach, flows from left side into the river in the town of Ellerau
Gronau, flows from left side into the river between Ellerau and Quickborn
Riedbach, flows into the river from the right in Pinneberg
Mühlenau, flows in from left side in Pinneberg
Appener Au (Beek), flows in from left side  in Appen
Bilsbek, flows into the river from the right between Prisdorf and Tornesch
Ohrtbrookgraben, flows into the river from the right between Tornesch und Uetersen

History 
The Pinnau was called in earlier times Ütristina or in later times Aue to Ueterst.

Federal Water Street 
It is one of the inland waterways, on which the German  (Maritime Traffic Regulations) applies.

See also 
List of rivers of Schleswig-Holstein

References

External links 

 Längen (in km) der Hauptschifffahrtswege (Hauptstrecken und bestimmte Nebenstrecken) der Binnenwasserstraßen des Bundes, Wasser- und Schifffahrtsverwaltung des Bundes

Rivers of Schleswig-Holstein
Rivers of Germany